Haberlandia janzi is a moth in the family Cossidae. It is found in Ivory Coast. The habitat consists of semi-deciduous forests.

The wingspan is about 18 mm. The fore- and hindwings are deep colonial buff with buffy olive lines.

Etymology
The species is named in honour of André Janz.

References

Natural History Museum Lepidoptera generic names catalog

Endemic fauna of Ivory Coast
Moths described in 2011
Metarbelinae
Taxa named by Ingo Lehmann